Rose Grove railway station is a railway station serving the Rose Grove area and town of Padiham in Lancashire, England. It is served by both the Caldervale Line and the East Lancashire Line. It was once the terminus of the Great Harwood Loop between Blackburn and Burnley via Great Harwood and Padiham. The station is now a junction station for both the Caldervale and East Lancashire Lines.

History
The railway reached Rose Grove in 1848 and the East Lancashire Railway Company opened a station in the area. The station was opened to serve the Rose Grove area and also the town of Padiham which was a slight distance away from the station. Rose Grove was formerly the site of an engine shed, which was one of the last to house steam locomotives on British Railways. The station became unstaffed in the 1980s, following the demolition of the station buildings. 

The last remnants of the Great Harwood Loop towards  have also disappeared, the line having been closed in 1993 with the end of oil traffic to the power station there. The site is now  occupied by the M65 motorway, which runs beside the railway at this point. During the mid to late 1980s, Rose Grove was the starting point for an Inter City "Holidaymaker" Saturday service - in the 1989 timetable this ran as the 06:50 to  via Preston and Birmingham New Street and the terminus for the 14:10 from Paignton return journey.

Services
In the winter 2022 timetable, the station has two services per hour in each direction Mondays to Saturdays.

On Sundays, the East Lancashire service drops to two-hourly (though running through to/from  but that to/from Manchester remains hourly (and continues to ).

References

External links

Railway stations in Burnley
DfT Category F1 stations
Former Lancashire and Yorkshire Railway stations
Railway stations in Great Britain opened in 1848
Northern franchise railway stations